The First Nations Governance Act was a legislative initiative proposed by the Government of Canada in 2002 to reform the country's Indian Act. Introduced by Robert Nault, then the minister of Indian affairs, it was met with opposition from several indigenous groups and, despite its name, was never passed into law. Chrétien's successor, Paul Martin, abandoned the legislation shortly after he assumed office in 2003.

The Act would have introduced a framework for First Nations to design new codes for elections, financial management, and administration. It would have also brought bands under the Canadian Human Rights Act.

Nault's stated purpose in proposing the legislation was to make native reserves more democratic and accountable. He said that his proposals represented an "interim step towards self-government" and were a response to demands by indigenous activists who opposed secrecy and corruption in their communities. Nault also sought to have representatives of indigenous groups on the House of Commons committee that reviewed the bill.

Several chiefs across the country opposed the act, arguing that Nault had not undertaken proper consultations. Matthew Coon Come, then the leader of the Assembly of First Nations, argued that the legislation was grounded in the same paternalistic model as the Indian Act. Margaret Swan of Manitoba's Southern Chiefs' Organization said that indigenous communities were not opposed to greater accountability and transparency, but added that Nault had made a serious error in bypassing the elected leadership of these communities.

Nault acknowledged in late 2003 that the legislation would not pass. In early 2004, Paul Martin formally announced that the legislation would be discarded.

References

Canadian Aboriginal and indigenous law
Proposed laws of Canada
2002 in Canadian law